SQP may refer to:

 Sequential quadratic programming, an iterative method for constrained nonlinear optimization
 South Quay Plaza, a residential-led development under construction in Canary Wharf on the Isle of Dogs, London
 SQP, the ICAO code for SkyUp, Kyiv, Ukraine